Jeanne de Divion (c. 1293–6 October 1331) was a French forger.

Jeanne was the daughter of the impoverished noble Havet de Divion and Sara Louchard, and married the knight Pierre de Broyes. She was known for her knowledge of astrology, and made a scandal by living openly with her lover, Thierry Larchier d'Hirson. When d'Hirson, then the bishop of Arras, died, he left Jeanne 3000 livres. The executor of his will, Countess Mahaut of Artois, paid the inheritance but later challenged it as being based on an adulterous liaison with a bishop, and obtained the restitution.

In 1331, Countess Mahaut's nephew Robert used a forgery created by Jeanne attesting to the will of his father as a means to reclaim the County of Artois from Mahaut. This deception was discovered, and Robert lost any hope of acquiring Artois. Jeanne was condemned and burned at the stake for forgery on 6 October 1331, at the Place aux Pourceaux in Paris.

In fiction
Jeanne de Divion is a minor character in Les Rois maudits (The Accursed Kings), a series of French historical novels by Maurice Druon which includes a retelling of her forgery.

References

Further reading
 

1331 deaths
14th-century executions by France
14th-century French people
Executed French women
Forgers
People executed by France by burning
People executed for forgery
Year of birth uncertain